Jury Duty is a 1995 American courtroom comedy film directed by John Fortenberry, written by Neil Tolkin, Barbara Williams, and Adam Small (credited as Samantha Adams), and starring Pauly Shore, Tia Carrere, Stanley Tucci, Brian Doyle-Murray, Shelley Winters, and Abe Vigoda.

The film was actress Billie Bird's last screen appearance. Reviews were negative, and the film was a box office bomb.

Plot
Tommy Collins is an unemployed erotic dancer living at his mother's home in a trailer park while he looks for a decent job. He finds out that his mother, and her boyfriend Jed, a polystyrene collector, are going to Las Vegas to be married and taking the mobile home with them. Although his mother had arranged for Tommy to stay with the Woodalls, he considers them awful people and decides to look for other living arrangements for him and his chihuahua Peanut (who loves the game show Jeopardy!).

He rummages through the trash and finds his letter for jury duty that he had thrown away and decides to enter. Each of the jurors get their own free accommodation plus $5 a day. After several cases he gets chosen to be a juror for a murder case involving a man named Carl Wayne Bishop, a fast-food employee who had been fired and is now accused of murdering several other fast-food employees. The evidence against him gets stronger when several employees appear as witnesses saying that he threatened to kill them.

All the jurors are staying at the Holiday Suite in the section that is being remodeled. Tommy seems to be enjoying himself, until he finds he is sharing his room with his former high school principal, who puts motivational tapes on at night to full blast. He makes a deal with the manager of the hotel who says that he will get a different room if he advertises their business during news broadcasts. Tommy agrees and ends up staying in a luxurious suite.

Finally, the jurors go to the jury room for deliberation and appoint Tommy as their foreman. The other jurors immediately think that Bishop is guilty and want to vote straight away. Not wanting to lose his suite and luxurious lifestyle, Tommy votes not guilty and stalls and prolongs the deliberations as well as continuously going over the evidence. After many delays, the other jurors become increasingly angry with Tommy, especially Monica, whom Tommy had fallen in love with, and threaten to throw him out of the jury unless he finds a better way to prove Bishop's innocence.

After reading up on the law and further investigating, both of which are activities prohibited under standard instructions to jurors, Tommy finds some evidence after seeing a picture of Carl Wayne Bishop on the window of a store, finally convincing the jurors that Bishop is not guilty; they celebrate. Unfortunately, later on, Monica finds Peanut and follows him up to Tommy's luxury suite, with security guard Murphy following her. Even though Tommy tries to explain that he is now a changed person, she is deeply upset with how he used them and walks out in tears.

Later, the Judge declares a mistrial and arranges another hearing at a later date. Back at the trailer park, Tommy goes mining for polystyrene with Jed at the city dump. After seeing many polystyrene containers with fast food logos on them, Tommy realizes that the murderer was an environmentalist. He calls Monica, who immediately hangs up on him, but he goes looking for Frank, another fellow juror, who was also obsessed with the environment. Later that night, someone meets another man named Frank who thanks him for volunteering to do jury duty on his behalf while he was on vacation, only to be killed with a stun gun. The killer is revealed to be Frank, the man Tommy was seeking. Tommy arrives at the same house and relays his new evidence to Frank, asking him to help find Monica at the library she works at in order to convince her that his evidence is genuine.

When they arrive at the library, Frank reveals to Tommy and Monica that he was the killer. He ties them up and attempts to stab them with a sharp jagged knife. He tells them that he committed the terrible murders and framed Carl Wayne Bishop because he thought there was no truth and justice in the world. With Peanut's help, however, they manage to subdue Frank and knock him unconscious.

Tommy is given a check for his contribution to the case, and Monica starts dating Tommy. He uses his earnings from erotic dancing towards law school and eventually becomes an attorney. Meanwhile, Peanut is shown accomplishing his lifelong dream of becoming a contestant on Jeopardy!.

Cast

Pauly Shore as Thomas B. "Tommy" Collins
Gizmo as Peanut
Tia Carrere as Monica Lewis
Stanley Tucci as Frank/Billy
Brian Doyle-Murray as Harry
Abe Vigoda as Judge Edward J. Powell
Charles Napier as Jed
Sean Whalen as Carl Wayne Bishop
Richard Edson as Skeets
Richard Riehle as Principal Beasley
Alex Datcher as Sarah
Richard T. Jones as Nathan

Jack McGee as Murphy, the security guard
Sharon Barr as Libby Starling
Nick Bakay as Richard Hurtz
Ernie Lee Banks as Ray
Shelley Winters as Mrs. Collins ("Mom")
Dick Vitale as Hal Gibson
Billie Bird as Rose
William Newman as Judge D'Angelo
Jorge Luis Abreu as Jorge
Siobhan Fallon as Heather
Gregory Cooke as Reece Fishburne
Mark L. Taylor as Russell Cadbury
Rick Ducommun as The Real Frank (uncredited)

Production 

The film is loosely based on the teleplay Twelve Angry Men, which itself was adapted into film in 1957 starring Henry Fonda.

Critical reception 
At review aggregation site Rotten Tomatoes, the film received an approval rating of 0%, based on 12 reviews with an average score of 2.4/10, as of July 26, 2014.

Critic Leonard Maltin gave it a "BOMB" rating in his book Movie and Video Guide, but suggested even that rating "may be too high". Critic Roger Ebert said, on At the Movies, that Pauly Shore was the "cinematic equivalent of long fingernails, drawn very slowly and quite loudly over a gigantic blackboard" and noted that although his co-host, Gene Siskel, disliked Chris Farley, he would "rather attend a dusk-to-dawn Chris Farley film festival than sit through any 5 minutes of Jury Duty". Siskel agreed, referring to Shore as "aggravating". Ebert estimated that Shore's "appeal must be limited to people whose self-esteem and social skills are so damaged that they find humor, or at least relief, in at last encountering a movie character less successful than themselves".

Pauly Shore "won" a Golden Raspberry Award for Worst Actor. The film itself was nominated for Most Painfully Unfunny Comedy at the 1995 Stinkers Bad Movie Awards but lost to Ace Ventura: When Nature Calls.

References

External links

1995 films
1995 comedy films
American comedy films
American courtroom films
American legal films
Juries in fiction
Films directed by John Fortenberry
Films scored by David Kitay
TriStar Pictures films
Triumph Films films
1995 directorial debut films
Golden Raspberry Award winning films
1990s English-language films
1990s American films